Nigel Christopher Waterson (born 12 October 1950) is a British former politician. He was the Conservative Member of Parliament for Eastbourne from 1992 until 2010. Waterson was a junior minister in the government of John Major. He has been the chairman of the Equity Release Council since 2012.

Early life
He attended Leeds Grammar School (then a direct grant grammar school) and at The Queen's College, Oxford he read law, graduating with a BA in 1971. He became a barrister and founded the firm Waterson Hicks. From 1974 to 1978 he was a councillor on Hammersmith and Fulham borough council.

Parliamentary career
He contested Islington South and Finsbury in 1979.

Waterson was the Shadow Minister for Pensions and Conservative Spokesman for Older People. He is a patron of many local charities, including President of the Eastbourne Constitutional Club and Vice President for Age Concern - Eastbourne. In the Conservative leadership contest in 2005 he backed Ken Clarke to be the next leader before Clarke lost in a preliminary round.

Waterson lost his seat to the Liberal Democrat Stephen Lloyd in the 2010 general election. This was just following the parliamentary expenses scandal, and Lloyd used his campaign literature to make claims about Waterson's expenses. Following the election, Waterson sued Lloyd for libel over these statements. Waterson lost this case on appeal in 2013, after winning the initial High Court case in 2011.

Personal life
Waterson married Barbara Judge in 1999. He had two previous marriages, both ending in divorce, and has a son and a daughter.  
On 29 January 2008, Waterson was arrested for allegedly assaulting his two teenage children. In 2010 the Metropolitan Police Service apologised for any distress caused by the arrest, accepting the allegations were wholly unfounded, and paid damages and costs to Waterson in settlement of a civil claim for wrongful arrest and false imprisonment.

References

External links
 
 
 Guardian Unlimited Politics - Ask Aristotle: Nigel Waterson MP
 TheyWorkForYou.com - Nigel Waterson MP
 BBC Politics
 BBC Sussex

1950 births
Conservative Party (UK) MPs for English constituencies
Living people
Councillors in the London Borough of Hammersmith and Fulham
Members of the Bow Group
People educated at Leeds Grammar School
Alumni of The Queen's College, Oxford
Presidents of the Oxford University Conservative Association
Politicians from Leeds
English barristers
UK MPs 1992–1997
UK MPs 1997–2001
UK MPs 2001–2005
UK MPs 2005–2010